Vladimir Aleksandrovich Goncharov (also Vladimir Gontcharov, ; born 21 May 1977) is a Russian sport shooter. He collected a total of three bronze medals in pistol shooting at the ISSF World Shooting Championships (2002, 2006, and 2014), and was also selected to represent Russia at the 2000 Summer Olympics in Sydney, finishing ninth in the air pistol and fourth in the free pistol. Gontcharov is also a member of the shooting team for Dynamo St. Petersburg, under head coach Anatoliy Suslov.

Gontcharov qualified for the Russian squad in pistol shooting at the 2000 Summer Olympics in Sydney after shooting a mandatory minimum score of 590 in air pistol at the 1999 ISSF World Cup meet in the same Olympic venue. In the men's air pistol, Gontcharov scored 572 points to share the ninth position with neighboring Uzbekistan's Dilshod Mukhtarov in the prelims, nearly missing out the final round by a two-point deficit. Gontcharov gave himself a chance to improve his feat in the men's free pistol by occupying one of the top eight slots for the final round, but eventually fired a disastrous 7.3-point shot in the ninth series that dropped him out of the medal podium to fourth with a final score of 662.5, finishing just behind the bronze medalist Martin Tenk of the Czech Republic by a 0.3-point margin.

At the 2014 ISSF World Shooting Championships in Granada, Spain, Gontcharov edged out China's Pu Qifeng by a tremendous 1.1-point advantage to claim his third career bronze medal (the first one being done in 2002 and the other in 2006) in the men's air pistol with 178.9 points. Despite missing out his chance to try for three consecutive Olympic bids since 2000, Gontcharov's third-place finish at the World Championships had guaranteed him an Olympic slot for the Russian team at the 2016 Summer Olympics, signifying his possible comeback from a sixteen-year absence.

References

External links
ISSF Profile

1977 births
Living people
Russian male sport shooters
Olympic shooters of Russia
Shooters at the 2000 Summer Olympics
Shooters at the 2016 Summer Olympics
People from Sosnovy Bor, Leningrad Oblast
Shooters at the 2015 European Games
European Games bronze medalists for Russia
European Games medalists in shooting
Sportspeople from Leningrad Oblast